The 1976 Dutch Grand Prix was a Formula One motor race held at Circuit Zandvoort on 29 August 1976. It was won by British driver James Hunt driving a McLaren M23 on his 29th birthday. The race, contested over 75 laps, was the twelfth round of the 1976 Formula One season.

The weekend was marred by the death of track marshal Ron Lenderink during a touring car support race. He was 29.

Qualifying

Qualifying classification

Race

Race classification

Championship standings after the race

Drivers' Championship standings

Constructors' Championship standings

Note: Only the top five positions are included for both sets of standings. Only the best 7 results from the first 8 races and the best 7 results from the last 8 races counted towards the Championship. Numbers without parentheses are Championship points; numbers in parentheses are total points scored. Points do not reflect final results of 1976 British Grand Prix as it was under appeal.

References

Dutch Grand Prix
Dutch Grand Prix
European Grand Prix
1976 in Dutch motorsport
Dutch Grand Prix